Sarumba is a 1950 American musical drama film directed by Marion Gering and starring Michael Whalen, Doris Dowling and Tommy Wonder. As of 1949 the film was reported to be owned outright by Walter Gould.

Cast
 Michael Whalen as Señor Valdez 
 Doris Dowling as Hildita 
 Tommy Wonder as Joe Thomas 
 Dee Tatum as Maria 
 Rodriguez Molina as Rodriguez 
 Shelia Garret as Helen 
 Manuel Folgoso as The Beggar 
 Red Davis as Manager, La Paloma 
 Ira Wolfer as Sailor 
 John D. Bonin as Sailor 
 Collins Hay as Sailor 
 Laurette Campeau as Laurie

References

Bibliography
 Darby, William. Masters of Lens and Light: A Checklist of Major Cinematographers and Their Feature Films. Scarecrow Press, 1991.

External links

1950 films
American musical drama films
American black-and-white films
1950s musical drama films
Films directed by Marion Gering
Eagle-Lion Films films
Films set in Havana
1950 drama films
1950s English-language films
1950s American films